Plod may refer to:
a slang term for a policeman
Mr. Plod, a fictional police officer in the Noddy stories written by Enid Blyton
Postman Plod, a fictional character from the British adult spoof comic magazine Viz